György Kósa (24 April 1897, Budapest – 16 August 1984, Budapest) was a Hungarian composer.

Kósa studied with Béla Bartók, Zoltán Kodály, and Victor von Herzfeld between 1905 and 1916. From 1927, he taught piano at the Budapest Conservatory.

He composed nine operas, four ballets, and incidental music for four pantomimes, as well as nine symphonies, one orchestral suite, chamber music, eleven oratorios, several cantatas, one mass, one setting of the Dies Irae, two requiems, and lieder.

His chamber works include: a string trio, a cello sonata (1965), a sonatina for cello solo (1928), a string quartet entitled "Self-portrait" (1920), a second quartet (1929), In memoriam... for solo viola (1977), a duo for violin and viola (1943), and twelve miniatures for a harp trio (1965).

External links
György Kósa at the Budapest Music Centre
Article on Kósa at Magyar Radio 

1897 births
1984 deaths
20th-century classical composers
Hungarian classical composers
Hungarian male classical composers
Hungarian classical pianists
Male classical pianists
Musicians from Budapest
Hungarian opera composers
Male opera composers
20th-century classical pianists
Pupils of Béla Bartók
20th-century Hungarian male musicians
Jewish classical composers